Pickelhering or Pickelhäring was the nickname given to the comic character or stage buffoon in English comedy troupes that travelled through Germany in the 17th century. The term literally meant "pickled herring". 

As with wurst ("sausage") in the name, Hanswurst, the figure of fun in 18th century German travelling theatres, or potage ("soup") in the name, Jean Potage, its French equivalent, the name refers to the everyday fare of the common people as opposed to the fine food of court society. Pickelhering is thus a servant figure in contrast to the high-ranking characters of the Haupt-und-Staatsaktions, the German dramas performed by such theatres. The name also alludes to the greediness that has characterized comic characters since Aristophanes.

Andreas Gryphius has a Pickelhering appear in his play Absurda Comica oder Herr Peter Squentz (1658) as "the king's comic advisor".

References

Literature 
 Beller, Manfred and Joseph Theodoor Leerssen, eds. (2007). "Character (Dramatic)" in  Imagology: The Cultural Construction and Literary Representation of National Characters. Amsterdam/New York: Rodopi.

Weblinks

Andreas Gryphius: Absurda Comica at Gutenberg

Stock characters by theatrical genre
Comedy theatre characters
Male characters in theatre